Aetbaar is a 2004 Indian Hindi-language romantic psychological thriller film directed by Vikram Bhatt and stars Amitabh Bachchan, John Abraham, Bipasha Basu and Supriya Pilgaonkar. Business tycoon Ratan Tata entered Bollywood by producing Aetbaar.
Aetbaar is inspired by the Hollywood film Fear. Vikram Bhatt had earlier directed another movie based on the Hollywood film Fear, called Inteha, which had released just 3 months earlier.

Synopsis 

Ever since his son died in a car accident fifteen years ago, Dr. Ranveer has been very protective of his daughter Ria. While walking home on a rainy night from college, Ria gets frightened as a gang of motorcyclists zoom by her, making her drop her umbrella. She yells at them until they stop feet away, and when one of the men removes his helmet and walks over to Ria, helping her pick up her wet notebooks.

On another day, Ria and her friends go to a club, and the man who had helped Ria approaches her while at the bar. She is surprised to meet him again and is stunned when he tells her that he has been thinking about her ever since that rainy night. He forces her to dance, and there she feels something for him then, but she does not want to admit it. Dr. Ranveer shows up asking for Ria. The man introduces himself as Aryan before she leaves. Dr. Ranveer wants to take Ria home. Aryan goes with his friends to a brothel where a prostitute named Saira teases Aryan and angers him when she asks him to sleep with her, to which he refuses. He takes her in a dark room where she thinks they are going to have sex, but Aryan brutally beats her up. Dr. Ranveer is called to the hospital to treat her.

The next morning, Aryan walks into Ria's class and takes her to his place, where he shows her a portrait he made of her the first night they met. When she tells him it's beautiful, more beautiful than her, he lights it on fire and tells her that there's nothing in the world that is better than her. She runs out of his apartment terrified, but realizes that she's fallen in love with him. They begin to spend time together, and he asks her if they can meet the next day. Ria walks into her house joyous and totally in love, where she learns that her parents have planned a surprise vacation to a cabin they rented for four days. Ria tells her parents that she does not want to miss out on any school, but they assure her she will not. They go to the cabin, and Ria thinks about Aryan, who is at his house looking gradually at the clock as hours pass by waiting for Ria. He then smashes his clock in rage. Ria cleans around the cabin and looks out the window to see Aryan. She rushes outside to look for him but does not see him.  Dr. Ranveer spots them together. He takes Ria home and tells her to call him over for tea. She is thrilled, and when Aryan comes over, he makes a good impression on her mother, but not her father, and Aryan tells Ria that he sensed that. Dr. Ranveer tells his wife that he's seen Aryan somewhere before and that it is something disturbing.

Aryan tries to steal a car with his friends so that they can sell it for money. But one of his friends gets injured in the process. They take him to the hospital. Dr. Ranveer tells the prostitute Saira that her wounds will heal eventually, and then she spots  Aryan, who is stunned to see Dr. Ranveer treating Saira, but he does not see Aryan. Saira tries to tell Dr. Ranveer that Aryan beat her, but Dr. Ranveer does not see Aryan's face.

One day while trying to find a colleague's phone number, Dr. Ranveer finds an old article about Aryan saying that he killed his own father, and he shows Ria and his wife. Ria confronts Aryan about this, and he tells her that he did kill his father for the sake of his mother because his father was drunk and he would beat his mother every day and one day from college, he finds out that his mother had died. So he burnt his father alive. Ria then apologizes, and they make up. She tries to explain to her father, but he refuses to believe Aryan's innocence, pointing that he was still a killer. Ria then yells at her father, saying that he's so over-protective just because his son died, and that he's making everyone miserable and Ria's mother slaps her, and Ria tells them that she hates them.

Dr. Ranveer decides to dig deeper and finds out that Aryan's mother is alive, and the reason Aryan killed his father was because Aryan was in love with his college teacher named Sanjana. She was leaving the city and getting married when Aryan goes to her house and tries to kill her. His father intervenes with the police, and Aryan is locked up in his room. Sanjana stops by his house to thank his father, and she leaves, and Aryan snaps. The parents see a fire starting inside Aryan's room. His father bursts through the door where Aryan hurls him into the fire.

Dr. Ranveer devises a plan to lure Aryan into believing that Sanjana is back to warn Ria about Aryan, and he finds out that it was just a trick to show Ria his true self. Ria feels horrible that she trusted and loved someone like him, and Aryan gets dragged away by the police for attempting to kill "Sanjana", who was really Ria's friend. A while later, Dr. Ranveer gets a call saying that Aryan has escaped from prison. Ria tells her parents that he knows they are at the cabin and will come and get her, and if she refuses to leave with him, he will kill her.

Aryan arrives with his friends and breaks into the cabin. Aryan ask Ria to come with him. Dr. Ranveer pulls an anchor attached to a rope which goes through Aryan, killing him.

The next morning Dr. Ranveer drops Ria off at college and tells her that she needs to be strong and not think of this again. She runs into her friends who joke and laugh with her as Dr. Ranveer looks at his daughter smiling, and he wipes away a tear from his eye, knowing that everything is back to normal.

Cast 
 Amitabh Bachchan as Dr. Ranveer Malhotra, a doctor from Mumbai who is very protective of his daughter Ria but failed to protect his son Rohit.
 John Abraham  as Aryan Trivedi, a deadly and obsessed man who is madly in love with Ria. 
 Bipasha Basu as Ria Malhotra, a young college student who is also Sheetal & Ranveer's daughter.
 Supriya Pilgaonkar as Sheetal Malhotra, Ranveer's wife and Ria's mother.
 Ali Asgar as Deepak, Ria's friend
 Amardeep Jha as Mrs. Trivedi, Aryan's mother.
 Tom Alter as Dr. Freddie, Ranveer's friend.
 Pramod Moutho as Police Commissioner Lalit Mohan Tiwari
 Shruti Ulfat as Sanjana, Aryan's college teacher who left for America to get married.
 Prithvi Zutshi as Dev Trivedi, Aryan's father, who was burnt alive.
 Deepak Shirke as Police Inspector

Soundtrack
The entire soundtrack is available on Sony Music.

External links

References 

2004 films
2004 psychological thriller films
2004 action thriller films
2000s Hindi-language films
Films directed by Vikram Bhatt
Indian action thriller films
Films scored by Rajesh Roshan
Indian psychological thriller films
Films with screenplays by Robin Bhatt
Indian romantic thriller films
Hindi-language thriller films
2000s romantic thriller films